Kanak News is an Odia language cable and satellite news channel in Bhubaneswar, Odisha, India. This channel was launched in 2009 as Kanak TV. Its headquarters is in Bhubaneswar and is operated by Eastern Media Pvt. Limited. Kanak News Channel added on GSAT 10 satellite as a free to air channel.

Its tagline is "Paribartanara Swara". As of 2015, programs include Jatra Chalichi, Jeebanara Canvas, Business Leaders, Crime Reporter, and Page 3.

See also
List of Odia-language television channels
List of television stations in India

References

External links
 

Odia-language television channels
Television channels and stations established in 2009
Television stations in Bhubaneswar
Companies based in Bhubaneswar
2009 establishments in Orissa